Myopa dorsalis is a species belonging to the family Conopidae subfamily Myopinae.

Distribution
Myopa dorsalis is present in most of Europe (Austria, Belgium, Bulgaria, Czech Republic, Denmark, France, Germany, Italy, Poland, Romania, Slovakia, Spain, The Netherlands and in Switzerland). This species can also be found from North Africa to India and in  Iran.

Description

This fly is one of the biggest European conopids and it is not a very common insect, likewise almost all conopids. The body is mainly reddish-brown, mesonotum is black, while scutellum is reddish. The head is quite large and inflated-looking, with a kind of bubble at the front and short antennae, the snout is elongated with narrow white cheeks. The large eyes are reddish. The abdomen is reddish brown and it is  usually folded forward when the fly is in resting position. Tergites 4 and 5 are largely dusted. Legs are completely yellowish brown. Wings are  hyaline, without black markings. It can be distinguished from Sicus species by its longer cheeks.

Biology
The adults can be encountered feeding on nectar of many species of flowering plants. Their larvae are endoparasites of Hymenoptera aculeata.

References

 Smith, K. G. V. (1969) -  Diptera: Conopidae - Handbooks for the Identification of British Insects

Conopidae
Insects described in 1794
Taxa named by Carl Fredrik Fallén
Endoparasites